Spanish Solidarity (SE) was a Spanish far-right political party founded by former Civil Guard Lieutenant Colonel Antonio Tejero while in prison for his role in the failed 1981 Spanish coup. The party presented candidates to both houses of parliament for the 1982 general elections; its objective was to pass an act granting Tejero the necessary parliamentary immunity to avoid facing military criminal proceedings. Its president was Tejero himself, while the vice-presidents were Ángel López-Montero Juárez, Carlos Fernández Barallobre and María Jesús González de Castejón Moreno.

Using the slogan "Enter the Parliament with Tejero!", it appeared on the ballot in some electoral districts, obtaining 28,451 votes, or 0.14% nationwide, and failed to obtain any deputy or senator seats. Following its disappointing results, the party disappeared in November 1984 when it merged with the Juntas Españolas party.

References

Defunct political parties in Spain
Far-right political parties in Spain
Political parties established in 1982
Political parties disestablished in 1984